Origyn Web Browser (OWB) is a discontinued web browser that was synchronized with WebKit and sponsored by the technology company Pleyo. OWB provides a meta-port to an abstract platform with the aim of making porting to embedded or lightweight systems faster and easier. This port is used for embedded devices such as set-top boxes, and other consumer electronics.

OWB has also found popularity on the AmigaOS-like operating systems. Current versions include AmigaOS, AROS and MorphOS official ports.

When Sand-labs disappeared, MorphOS developer Fabien Coeurjoly took over and eventually renamed project to Odyssey Web Browser when it did not have any original Sand-labs code left.

History

OWB was created by Pleyo, a French software firm located in Montpellier, France in 2006.

Versions

Milestone versions of Origyn Web Browser:

Robespierre – November 22, 2007
Blastoise – July 1, 2008
DoDuo – July 1, 2008
Galekid – December 19, 2008
Galegon – February 11, 2009
Galeking – June 4, 2009
Pukapuka – October 8, 2009

Announced:

Pukarua – unreleased

Features

OWB is a web browser optimized for consumer electronics (CE) devices and embedded system, such as mobile phones, portable media players, set-top boxes (STB) and TV decoders, and various other consumer electronic products such as GPS, home-gateways, Web-radios, digital video recorder (PVR), DVD recorders, wireless devices, etc.

OWB is based on Webkit by Apple, and its ease of porting is based upon a browser abstraction layer called OWBAL. The existence of this abstraction layer architecture dramatically eases the task of integrating OWB in CE devices, resulting in fast and easy implementation on target platforms. The aim of the abstraction layer is to allow CE software producers to leverage extant libraries, instead of needing to port the browser and its full set of dependencies.

OWBAL abstraction is based on interfaces, which are described through abstract classes, and these classes contain only pure virtual methods. No default implementation is allowed.

General characteristics

OWB supports full Cascading Style Sheet (CSS) 2.1, CSS3 support, styleable form controls, enhanced rich text editing, XML technologies, XPath (GTK port), SVG (partial SVG 1.1 full) (GTK port, Qt port and Amiga port), XSLT processor, JavaScript API for XSLT, MathML, notifications, SquirrelFish Extreme (SFX) on x86, HTML5.

OWB features Netscape-style (NPAPI) plug-ins (GTK and MorphOS ports) including support for mplayer, Adobe Flash Player and DiamondX.

The browser can pass Acid2 test with a 100% evaluation on all ports and Acid3 test with a 99% evaluation on SDL port and a 100% evaluation on ports for GTK, Qt, Amiga, and MorphOS.

It features also accessibility support and support for cross document messaging, databases, datagrid, dom storage, filtera, geolocation, icon database, offline web application, server-sent events, sharedWorker video/audio, WebSockets, Worker and 3D support.

Platform graphics engines include GTK, Qt, SDL, Cairo with Magic User Interface and Win32 (not yet public).

The font engine used is Freetype.

OWB is also POSIX compliant.

Origyn can handle threads (with Pthreads) and supports GTK, Qt and uClibc.

Odyssey Web Browser
Odyssey Web Browser is probably the most mature of the Amiga and Amigalike-OS ports, as it has a download manager and much of the other UI features of a modern browser already separately added by its developer. Version 1.6 (December 2009) sports Adobe Flash SWF player plug-in based on Swfdec, version 1.6.1 has been integrated with web profiling and debugging tool called Webinspector. Since version 1.7 (March 2010), Odyssey supports also HTML5 tags and media content through FFmpeg.

MorphOS release of OWB is also distributed in a Lite version for the minimal computer motherboard Efika.

Screenshots
The following are several screenshots showing the various features of OWB.

See also 
 Comparison of web browsers
 List of web browsers

Other web browsers for MorphOS/AmigaOS

References

External links 
 Infos about OWB for Classic AmigaOS at Amigaweb.net
 AROS port at GitHub

AmigaOS 4 software
AROS software
Free web browsers
MorphOS software
Software based on WebKit
Web browsers for AmigaOS